NGC 4095 is an elliptical galaxy located 330 million light-years away in the constellation Coma Berenices. The galaxy was discovered by astronomer William Herschel on April 26, 1785. NGC 4095 is a member of the NGC 4065 Group and is a LINER.

See also
 List of NGC objects (4001–5000)

References

External links
 

4095
038324
Coma Berenices
Astronomical objects discovered in 1785
Elliptical galaxies
NGC 4065 Group
LINER galaxies